Ian Palmer (born 4 September 1941) is an Australian sailor. He competed in the Flying Dutchman event at the 1960 Summer Olympics.

References

External links
 

1941 births
Living people
Australian male sailors (sport)
Olympic sailors of Australia
Sailors at the 1960 Summer Olympics – Flying Dutchman
Sportspeople from Perth, Western Australia
20th-century Australian people